Manor Kill is a river in Schoharie County in the state of New York. It begins northeast of Manorkill and flows westward before flowing into the Schoharie Reservoir southeast of Gilboa, New York. Manor Kill Falls is located on the creek where it passes under Prattsville Road (County Route 39). Since it drains into the Schoharie Reservoir, it is part of the New York City water supply system.

Hydrology

Manor Kill's watershed receives an average  of precipitation annually. Most of it is concentrated in seasonal events such as summer thunderstorms, remnants of hurricanes later in the year or rain-on-snow events in springtime. This pattern of precipitation, combined with the Manor Kill watershed's slopes and low drainage density, results in flashiness, as the stream and its tributaries rise and fall quickly in response to storm events. The forests that cover much of the watershed tend to mitigate this somewhat.

The United States Geological Survey (USGS) maintains one stream gauge along Manor Kill.

History
The village of Conesville was previously known as "Stone Bridge" because of the great arched stone bridge that stood where the present bridge crosses the Bearkill. This bridge was washed away in a flood of 1874.

References

Rivers of New York (state)
Rivers of Schoharie County, New York